Bismack Biyombo Sumba (born August 28, 1992) is a Congolese professional basketball player for the Phoenix Suns of the National Basketball Association (NBA). He was selected with the seventh overall pick in the 2011 NBA draft by the Sacramento Kings and subsequently traded to the Charlotte Bobcats (now Hornets). Biyombo has also played for the Toronto Raptors and the Orlando Magic.

Early life
Biyombo was born in Lubumbashi, Zaire, to parents François and Françoise Biyombo along with his three brothers, Billy, Biska, and Bikim, and three sisters, Bimeline, Bikelene, and Bimela. He played for Lupopo in the 2008 FIBA Africa Clubs Champions Cup, Africa's premier senior league, at age 16.

He was discovered by coach Mário Palma at the age of 16 at a youth tournament in Yemen. His play impressed Palma and earned him an opportunity to train in Spain.

Biyombo started the 2009–10 season with Fuenlabrada-Getafe Madrid of the EBA before moving to CB Illescas of the LEB Silver league. He also started the 2010–11 season with CB Illescas before moving to Baloncesto Fuenlabrada of the ACB league in January 2011.

Professional career

Fuenlabrada (2011)
Biyombo made his debut in the Spanish ACB League with Fuenlabrada against DKV Joventut on January 9, 2011, recording 5 points and 7 rebounds in just over 13 minutes of play. In Fuenlabrada's narrow defeat to Real Madrid, he recorded 6 points and 3 blocks, one of them against former Spanish League MVP and Spanish national team player, Felipe Reyes.

At the 2011 Nike Hoops Summit, Biyombo participated for the World Select Team (against the USA Select Team), and recorded a triple double, with 12 points, 11 rebounds, and 10 blocks. It was the first recorded triple-double in the Summit's history.

Charlotte Bobcats / Hornets (2011–2015)

Biyombo was drafted seventh overall by the Sacramento Kings in the 2011 NBA draft, but his rights were later traded to the Charlotte Bobcats in a draft night trade. On December 19, 2011, Biyombo signed a multi-year deal with the Bobcats. After averaging five points per game over his first two seasons with Charlotte, Biyombo's minutes and subsequent production dropped dramatically in 2013–14 as he fell out of favor with coach Steve Clifford, as he averaged just 2.9 points in 13.9 minutes per game.

The Bobcats changed their name to the Hornets ahead of the 2014-15 season. While his forte in defense and rebounding did drop in 2013–14, Biyombo began the 2014–15 season in much better form despite missing seven out of the first eight games of the season largely due to the acquisition of Jason Maxiell in the 2014 off-season. With the late-December injury to center Al Jefferson, Biyombo was placed into the starting line-up. On June 30, 2015, the Hornets decided not to extend a qualifying offer to Biyombo, making him an unrestricted free agent.

Toronto Raptors (2015–2016)
On July 18, 2015, Biyombo signed a two-year, $5.7 million contract with the Toronto Raptors. On August 1, 2015, he played for Team Africa at the 2015 NBA Africa exhibition game. He made his debut for the Raptors in the team's season opener against the Indiana Pacers on October 28, recording 7 points and 5 rebounds in a 106–99 win. Biyombo started in 18 straight games between mid-November and late December while Jonas Valančiūnas was recovering from a fractured hand. On December 17, he recorded 8 points, a then career-high 18 rebounds, and a career-high tying 7 blocks in a loss to the Charlotte Hornets. Five days later, he recorded 9 points and a then career-high 20 rebounds in a 103–99 win over the Dallas Mavericks. Biyombo returned to a bench role on December 30. He returned to the starting line-up in mid-March with Valančiūnas out injured again. On March 17, 2016, Biyombo scored a career-high 16 points and set a franchise record with 25 rebounds in guiding the Raptors to a 101–94 overtime win over the Indiana Pacers. On March 30, he recorded seven points and six rebounds in a 105–97 win over the Atlanta Hawks, helping the Raptors record a 50-win season for the first time in franchise history.

The Raptors finished the regular season as the second seed in the Eastern Conference with a 56–26 record. In the first round of the playoffs, the Raptors faced the seventh-seeded Indiana Pacers, and in a Game 5 win on April 26, Biyombo recorded 10 points and 16 rebounds off the bench to help the Raptors take a 3–2 series lead. The Raptors went on to win the series 4–3, moving on to the second round where they faced the Miami Heat. In Game 7 of the Raptors' series with the Heat, Biyombo recorded 17 points and 16 rebounds as a starter in a 116–89 win, helping the Raptors advance to the conference finals for the first time in franchise history. In Game 3 of the conference finals against the Cleveland Cavaliers, Biyombo set a Toronto playoff record with 26 rebounds, helping the Raptors cut the Cavaliers' advantage in the series to 2–1. The Raptors went on to lose the series in six games.

After declining his $2.9 million player option for the 2016–17 season, Biyombo became an unrestricted free agent on June 7, 2016. Biyombo later revealed that he wished to re-sign with the Raptors, but with the re-signing of DeMar DeRozan, the Raptors did not have the salary cap space to make it possible.

Orlando Magic (2016–2018)

On July 7, 2016, Biyombo signed a four-year, $72 million contract with the Orlando Magic. After exceeding the flagrant foul limit during the 2016 playoffs, Biyombo was forced to serve an NBA-mandated one-game suspension to begin the 2016–17 season. He made his debut for the Magic in the team's second game of the season on October 28, scoring two points in just under 23 minutes in a 108–82 loss to the Detroit Pistons. On January 16, 2017, he scored a season-high 15 points against the Denver Nuggets. He tied that mark on February 11, scoring 15 points against the Dallas Mavericks. On March 5, he grabbed a season-high 15 rebounds against the Washington Wizards.

On January 1, 2018, Biyombo recorded 13 points and a season-high 17 rebounds in a 98–95 loss to the Brooklyn Nets. On January 12, he scored a career-high 21 points in a 125–119 loss to the Washington Wizards. On April 4, he had 12 points, 12 rebounds and a career-high five assists in a 105–100 win over the Dallas Mavericks.

Return to Charlotte (2018–2021)
On July 7, 2018, Biyombo was traded back to the Charlotte Hornets in a three-team deal. On January 5, 2019, he scored a season-high 16 points in a 123–110 loss to the Denver Nuggets.

On November 27, 2019, Biyombo recorded a season-high 19 points along with 9 rebounds and two blocks in a 102–101 win against the Detroit Pistons. On December 16, 2019, he logged a season-high 17 rebounds along with 11 points and a block against the Indiana Pacers.

Biyombo re-signed with the Hornets on November 30, 2020. On February 5, 2021, he scored a season-high 13 points, along with four rebounds and one assist in 19 minutes against the Utah Jazz. On April 13, he recorded a double-double of 10 points and 12 rebounds against the Los Angeles Lakers. On May 1, he had a season-high five blocks off the bench against the Detroit Pistons. Biyombo again scored 13 points on May 13, where he also recorded seven rebounds and one assist against the Los Angeles Clippers.

Phoenix Suns (2022–present)
Biyombo became an unrestricted free agent after the 2020–21 season. He did not sign with any team throughout 2021 in part due of him grieving for the passing of his father, François. On January 1, 2022, he signed a 10-day contract with the Phoenix Suns via the COVID-19 hardship exemption. On January 11, Biyombo signed for the rest of the season after showing off some very positive production during his 10-day contract. On January 17, Biyombo had 17 points and 14 rebounds. Five days later, on January 22, Biyombo recorded 21 points, 13 rebounds, and 5 assists coming off the bench. From January 26–30, Biyombo became a starter once again due to injuries to Deandre Ayton and JaVale McGee. In the games Biyombo played from January up until February 12, the Suns were undefeated in the 17 games he played in.

On July 5, 2022, the Suns re-signed Biyombo.

Personal life
Biyombo is a Christian. He speaks five languages and reads in his spare time.

Biyombo started the Bismack Biyombo Foundation in 2016. During the COVID-19 pandemic in 2020, the foundation donated around $1 million worth of medical supplies to people in Congo.

Biyombo is eligible to play for the DR Congo men's national basketball team, but never played for the team, despite his intentions to do so in November 2018.

In March 2022, Biyombo announced that he had pledged his entire 2021–22 season salary towards the construction of a hospital in Congo, in honor of his father.

Career statistics

NBA

Regular season

|-
| style="text-align:left;"| 
| style="text-align:left;"| Charlotte
| 63 || 41 || 23.1 || .464 || — || .483 || 5.8 || .4 || .3 || 1.8 || 5.2
|-
| style="text-align:left;"| 
| style="text-align:left;"| Charlotte
| 80 || 65 || 27.3 || .451 || — || .521 || 7.3 || .4 || .4 || 1.8 || 4.8
|-
| style="text-align:left;"| 
| style="text-align:left;"| Charlotte
| 77 || 9 || 13.9 || .611 || — || .517 || 4.8 || .1 || .1 || 1.1 || 2.9
|-
| style="text-align:left;"| 
| style="text-align:left;"| Charlotte
| 64 || 21 || 19.4 || .543 || — || .583 || 6.4 || .3 || .3 || 1.5 || 4.8
|-
| style="text-align:left;"| 
| style="text-align:left;"| Toronto
| 82 || 22 || 22.0 || .542 || .000 || .628 || 8.0 || .4 || .2 || 1.6 || 5.5
|-
| style="text-align:left;"| 
| style="text-align:left;"| Orlando
| 81 || 27 || 22.1 || .526 || — || .534 || 7.0 || .9 || .3 || 1.1 || 6.0
|-
| style="text-align:left;"| 
| style="text-align:left;"| Orlando
| 82 || 25 || 18.2 || .520 || .000 || .534 || 5.7 || .8 || .3 || 1.2 || 5.7
|-
| style="text-align:left;"| 
| style="text-align:left;"| Charlotte
| 54 || 32 || 14.5 || .571 || — || .637 || 4.6 || .6 || .2 || .8 || 4.4
|-
| style="text-align:left;"| 
| style="text-align:left;"| Charlotte
| 53 || 29 || 19.4 || .543 || — || .603 || 5.8 || .9 || .2 || .9 || 7.4
|-
| style="text-align:left;"| 
| style="text-align:left;"| Charlotte
| 66 || 36 || 20.4 || .587 || .000 || .448 || 5.3 || 1.2 || .3 || 1.1 || 5.0
|-
| style="text-align:left;"| 
| style="text-align:left;"| Phoenix
| 36 || 3 || 14.1 || .593 || — || .535 || 4.6 || .6 || .3 || .7 || 5.8
|- class="sortbottom"
| style="text-align:center;" colspan="2"| Career
| 738 || 310 || 19.9 || .530 || .000 || .564 || 6.1 || .6 || .3 || 1.3 || 5.2

Playoffs

|-
| style="text-align:left;"| 2014
| style="text-align:left;"| Charlotte
| 3 || 1 || 16.0 || .600 || — || .333 || 3.7 || .3 || .0 || .7 || 2.7
|-
| style="text-align:left;"| 2016
| style="text-align:left;"| Toronto
| 20 || 10 || 25.3 || .580 || — || .597 || 9.4 || .4 || .4 || 1.4 || 6.2
|-
| style="text-align:left;"| 2022
| style="text-align:left;"| Phoenix
| 9 || 0 || 9.5 || .647 || — || .500 || 2.1 || .6 || .1 || .2 || 2.8
|- class="sortbottom"
| style="text-align:center;" colspan="2"| Career
| 32 || 11 || 20.0 || .593 || — || .571 || 6.8 || .4 || .3 || 1.0 || 4.9

References

External links

 Bismack Biyombo at acb.com 
 

1992 births
Living people
21st-century Democratic Republic of the Congo people
Baloncesto Fuenlabrada players
CB Illescas players
Centers (basketball)
Charlotte Bobcats players
Charlotte Hornets players
Democratic Republic of the Congo expatriate basketball people in Spain
Democratic Republic of the Congo expatriate basketball people in the United States
Democratic Republic of the Congo men's basketball players
Liga ACB players
National Basketball Association players from the Democratic Republic of the Congo
Orlando Magic players
People from Lubumbashi
Phoenix Suns players
Sacramento Kings draft picks
Toronto Raptors players